is a Japanese former middle distance runner who competed in the 1972 Summer Olympics and in the 1976 Summer Olympics.

References

1948 births
Living people
Japanese male long-distance runners
Japanese male steeplechase runners
Olympic male long-distance runners
Olympic male steeplechase runners
Olympic athletes of Japan
Athletes (track and field) at the 1972 Summer Olympics
Athletes (track and field) at the 1976 Summer Olympics
Asian Games gold medalists for Japan
Asian Games gold medalists in athletics (track and field)
Athletes (track and field) at the 1974 Asian Games
Medalists at the 1974 Asian Games
Universiade bronze medalists for Japan
Universiade medalists in athletics (track and field)
Medalists at the 1970 Summer Universiade
Japan Championships in Athletics winners
20th-century Japanese people
21st-century Japanese people